The Scollard Formation is an Upper Cretaceous to lower Palaeocene stratigraphic unit of the Western Canada Sedimentary Basin in southwestern Alberta. Its deposition spanned the time interval from latest Cretaceous to early Paleocene, and it includes sediments that were deposited before, during, and after the Cretaceous-Paleogene (K-Pg) extinction event. It is significant for its fossil record, and it includes the economically important coal deposits of the Ardley coal zone.

Lithology 
The Scollard Formation consists primarily of sandstones and siltstones, interbedded with mudstones and, in the upper portion, coal seams, as well as minor amounts of bentonite.  The sediments were eroded from the Canadian Cordillera, and were transported eastward by river systems and deposited in fluvial channel and floodplain environments.

Stratigraphy 
The Scollard is usually classified as the uppermost formation of the Edmonton Group, although some early workers included it in the overlying Paskapoo Formation.  It is subdivided into an upper, coal-bearing member that consists of the Ardley coal zone, and a lower member that lacks significant coal.  Neither member has been formally named.

Age 

The K-Pg boundary occurs at the base of the lowermost seam of Ardley coal zone, based on dinosaurian and microfloral evidence, as well as the presence of the terminal Cretaceous iridium anomaly.  The upper member is therefore of early Danian age, while the lower member is of latest Maastrichtian age.

Distribution 
The Scollard Formation is present in the subsurface throughout much of southwestern Alberta, and it outcrops extensively along the banks of the Red Deer River in the area of Trochu. Both the upper and lower members thin from west to east.  Thicknesses for each member range from more than  near the foothills of the Canadian Rockies to less than  near the outcrops in south-central Alberta.

Relationship to other units 
The Scollard Formation rests disconformably on the Late Cretaceous Battle Formation in the southwestern Alberta plains, on the Wapiti Formation in the northwestern plains, and on the Brazeau Formation in the foothills.  It is unconformably overlain by the Paskapoo Formation, and where the Paskapoo has been removed by erosion, the Scollard is exposed at surface or covered by Quaternary sediments.

The Scollard grades into the Willow Creek Formation in the southern Alberta plains and the Coalspur Formation in the Alberta foothills.  The Ardley coal zone in the upper portion is equivalent to the lower part of the Coalspur coal zone of the Coalspur Formation, and is correlated with the lower part of the Ravenscrag Formation of southern Saskatchewan, which is also coal bearing.  The Late Cretaceous member is equivalent in age to the Frenchman Formation of Saskatchewan, the Hell Creek Formation of Montana, and the Lance Formation of Wyoming .

Coal deposits 

The zone is present at shallow depths and, in places, exposed at surface, along a trend between Red Deer and Edmonton. The coal is typically of sub-bituminous B to C rank, although more deeply buried Scollard coals farther to the west reach high-volatile bituminous rank. The Ardley coal has been mined in the Red Deer area, and is currently being mined west of Edmonton to fuel mine-mouth electric power generating stations.

Paleontology 
The Scollard Formation preserves the remains of vertebrates, especially dinosaurs and, rarely, mammals, as well as a wide range of plant fossils.  The Scollard strata span the K-Pg boundary, therefore the lower member of the Scollard provides a record of the last of the dinosaurs, while the upper member records the dawn of the Age of Mammals after the K-Pg extinction event.

Flora 
Plant fossils from the upper, early Paleocene member of the Scollard Formation include species of the ferns Botrychium, Woodwardia and Azolla; the conifers Metasequoia and Glyptostrobus; the monocot Limnobiophyllum (a relative of duckweeds); and the dicots Cercidiphyllum and Platanus.

Theropods 
Ornithomimus remains have been unearthed here.

Ornithischians 
Torosaurus remains have also been unearthed in this region. Edmontonia remains have also been unearthed here and in the nearby areas.

See also 
 List of dinosaur-bearing rock formations

References

Bibliography 
 Ryan, M. J., and Russell, A. P., 2001. Dinosaurs of Alberta (exclusive of  Aves): In: Mesozoic Vertebrate Life, edited by Tanke, D. H., and Carpenter,  K., Indiana University Press, pp. 279–297.
 Weishampel, David B.; Dodson, Peter; and Osmólska, Halszka (eds.): The Dinosauria, 2nd, Berkeley: University of California Press. 861 pp. .

Geologic formations of Alberta
Maastrichtian Stage of North America
Cretaceous Alberta
Cretaceous–Paleogene boundary
Danian Stage
Paleogene Alberta
Sandstone formations of Canada
Siltstone formations
Shale formations
Coal formations
Coal in Canada
Fluvial deposits
Fossiliferous stratigraphic units of North America
Paleontology in Alberta
Western Canadian Sedimentary Basin